Bohuslav Karlík (November 25, 1908 – September 29, 1996) was a Czechoslovak flatwater and slalom canoeist who competed from the late 1930s to the early 1950s. Competing in two Summer Olympics, he won the silver in the C-1 1000 m event at Berlin in 1936.

Karlík won a complete set of medals at the ICF Canoe Sprint World Championships with a gold in the C-2 10000 m (1938), a silver in the C-2 1000 m (1938), and a bronze in the C-2 10000 m events (1950).

In canoe slalom, he won a silver medal in the C-1 team event at the 1949 ICF Canoe Slalom World Championships in Geneva.

References

Wallechinsky, David and Jaime Loucky (2008). "Canoeing: Men's Canadian Doubles 1000 Meters". In The Complete Book of the Olympics: 2008 Edition. London: Aurum Press Limited. pp. 482–3.

1908 births
1996 deaths
Czech male canoeists
Czechoslovak male canoeists
Canoeists at the 1936 Summer Olympics
Canoeists at the 1952 Summer Olympics
Olympic canoeists of Czechoslovakia
Olympic silver medalists for Czechoslovakia
Olympic medalists in canoeing
ICF Canoe Sprint World Championships medalists in Canadian
Medalists at the 1936 Summer Olympics
Medalists at the ICF Canoe Slalom World Championships
Canoeists from Prague